Jordan Institute of Banking Studies is a public university located in Amman, Jordan. Established in 1971 by Central Bank of Jordan to presents a group of  academic programs and  training activities.

References

Universities and colleges in Jordan
Education in Amman